David Bararuk (born May 26, 1983) is a Canadian former professional ice hockey player. Bararuk played professionally in the North American minor leagues and in Finland from 2001–2007.

Bararuk was drafted by the Dallas Stars as their fifth-round pick, 147th overall, in the 2002 NHL Entry Draft. Bararuk played in the Stars organization from 2001–2006. He then moved to Europe and played two tryouts for teams in the Finnish SM-Liiga league.

Career statistics

Awards and honours

References

External links
 

1983 births
Living people
Ässät players
Canadian ice hockey forwards
Dallas Stars draft picks
Houston Aeros (1994–2013) players
Ice hockey people from Saskatchewan
Idaho Steelheads (ECHL) players
Ilves players
Iowa Stars players
Louisiana IceGators (ECHL) players
Moose Jaw Warriors players
Sportspeople from Moose Jaw
Utah Grizzlies (AHL) players